Jacqueline C. Cambas (born in New York City) is an American film editor.

Life 
Jacqueline Cambas was born in New York City. From 1972 until 1976 she studied education and psychology at the University of California, Los Angeles. Cambas was working as a teacher before she started to work in the film industry.

Since the mid 1970s Cambas was active as a film editor. In the beginning she was assistant editor for Tom Rolf, with whom she worked on films such as Hardcore, The Great Outdoors or Black Rain. Soon she started to work on her own. Since Racing with the Moon (1984) she often worked with director Richard Benjamin on films such as City Heat, The Money Pit, Little Nikita, My Stepmother Is an Alien, Downtown, Mermaids, Made in America, Milk Money, Mrs. Winterbourne, The Shrink Is In or Marci X.

Cambas is a member of American Cinema Editors (ACE), where she is a life member in the Board of Directors since 2017.

Selected filmography 
 1978: A Christmas to Remember (TV movie)
 1980: The Gong Show Movie
 1980: Midlife Crisis
 1981: Zoot Suit
 1982: Personal Best
 1982: Cat People
 1983: Surf II
 1984: Racing with the Moon
 1984: City Heat
 1986: The Money Pit
 1987: Light of Day
 1988: Little Nikita
 1988: My Stepmother Is an Alien
 1990: Downtown
 1990: Mermaids
 1991: Frankie and Johnny
 1992: School Ties
 1993: Made in America
 1994: Milk Money
 1995: Now and Then
 1996: Mrs. Winterbourne
 1998: The Pentagon Wars (TV movie)
 1998: The Proposition
 1998:  Tourist Trap (TV movie)
 1999: The Love Letter
 2001: The Sports Pages (TV movie)
 2001: Laughter on the 23rd Floor (TV movie)
 2001: The Shrink Is In
 2001: Freddy Got Fingered
 2003: Marci X
 2004: The Goodbye Girl (TV movie)
 2006: For the Love of a Child (TV movie)
 2006: A Little Thing Called Murder (TV movie)
 2006: Relative Strangers
 2006: The Butterfly Effect 2
 2006: Masters of Horror (TV series, episode 2x06 Pelts)
 2006–2008: Men in Trees (TV series, 16 episodes)
 2007: The Trouble with Romance
 2008: Life (TV series, 3 episodes)
 2010: Pretty Little Liars (TV series, episode 1x01)
 2010: Rollers
 2011: Vietnam in HD (Documentary series, 4 episodes)
 2013: Killer Beauty (TV movie)

References

External links 
 

Living people
American Cinema Editors
American film editors
American women film editors
Artists from New York City
Year of birth missing (living people)
21st-century American women